The Rashtriya Loktantrik Party (abbreviated as RLP) is an Indian political party in the state of Rajasthan. The party was founded by rebel Bharatiya Janata Party leader Hanuman Beniwal on the eve of the 2018 Rajasthan Legislative Assembly election.

The party entered into an alliance with the Bharatiya Janata Party on the eve of the 2019 Indian general election. It has extended its support to the 2020 Bharat Bandh and the Indian farmers' protest.

History 
Hanuman Beniwal was suspended by the Bharatiya Janata Party due to disagreements and corruption allegations against the senior leadership of the party, he had become an independent member of the Rajasthan Legislative Assembly. In 2018, Beniwal conducted the "Hunkar Rally" before the upcoming legislative assembly election and formed the Rashtriya Loktantrik Party which was supported by Ghanshyam Tiwari, Jayant Chaudhary and Sanjay Lathar.

The party received support from members of the Jat community, and was able to have its representatives elected on three seats of the legislative assembly. In 2019, the Rashtriya Loktantrik Party entered into an alliance with the Bharatiya Janata Party before the general election. It contested on the Nagaur seat and extends its support to the Bharatiya Janata Party on all other seats in the state.

Beniwal who had contested from the Nagaur seat was elected to the Lok Sabha. Following the passage of the 2020 Indian agriculture reform, Beniwal resigned from three parliamentary committees, and the party extended its support to the Indian farmers' protest and supported the all India general strike.

RLP Party Members
Hanuman Beniwal	        Founder, MP
Manish Choudhary	    General Secretary
Pukhraj Garg	        MLA, Bhopalgarh
Narayan Beniwal.     	MLA, Khinwasar
Indira Devi Bawari   	MLA, Merta
Rajpal Choudhary	    Spokesperson, Jaipur
Vivek Machra	        Spoesperson, Bikaner

References

External links 
Rashtriya Loktantrik Party on Hindi Mein Jankari
18 Live News

Political parties in India
2018 establishments in Rajasthan
Indian independence movement
Rashtriya Loktantrik Party
Political parties established in 2018